Top Country Albums is a chart that ranks the top-performing country music albums in the United States, published by Billboard.  In 1973, 21 different albums topped the chart, which was at the time published under the title Top Country LP's, based on sales reports submitted by a representative sample of stores nationwide.

In the issue of Billboard dated January 6, Merle Haggard was at number one with the compilation album The Best of the Best of Merle Haggard, the record's seventh week in the top spot.  The following week, it was displaced from the top spot by Got the All Overs for You by Freddie Hart and the Heartbeats, but Haggard returned to number one in the issue dated January 27 with It's Not Love (But It's Not Bad).  He achieved a third number one in September with I Love Dixie Blues...So I Recorded "Live" In New Orleans and was one of two artists with three chart-toppers during the year.  The other was Loretta Lynn, who reached number one with Entertainer of the Year – Loretta and Love Is the Foundation as well as Louisiana Woman, Mississippi Man, a collaboration with Conway Twitty.  The two singers had a run of success with duet recordings in the early 1970s alongside their ongoing solo careers.

Kris Kristofferson was one of several artists with two number one albums in 1973, topping the chart in consecutive weeks with Jesus Was a Capricorn and Full Moon, the latter a collaboration with Rita Coolidge, his then-wife.  Full Moons time at number one was ended by Marie Osmond, the younger sister of teen-pop stars the Osmonds, who achieved her first chart-topping album at the age of 14.  Jeanne Pruett had the year's longest unbroken run at number one, spending eight consecutive weeks at the top of the listing with her album Satin Sheets.  Charlie Rich spent four non-consecutive weeks at number one in June and July with his album Behind Closed Doors.  Having released his first records in the 1950s, Rich had finally achieved country music success in 1972 and become a mainstream star the following year.  Five months after it left the top spot, the album returned to number one in December, in the same week that Rich's song "The Most Beautiful Girl" reached number one on Billboards all-genre singles chart, the Hot 100.  The album would continue its success into 1974 and eventually spend a total of 21 weeks atop the chart, a new record total for an album.

Chart history

References

1973-related lists
1973
1973 record charts